Muara Tuang is the former name of the town of Kota Samarahan in Sarawak, Malaysia.

Muara Tuang may also refer to:

Muara Tuang (state constituency), a state constituency in Sarawak, Malaysia.